El Barraco is a municipality in the province of Ávila, Castile and León, Spain. , the municipality has a population of 2,152 inhabitants. It is located in the local valley of the Alberche river.

References 

Municipalities in the Province of Ávila